Festival of Lights or Celebration of Light may refer to:

Religious celebrations

Abrahamic religions 
Candlemas, a Christian holiday
Christmas, a Christian holiday
Eid al-Adha, a Muslim holiday
Eid al-Fitr, a Muslim holiday
Hanukkah, a Jewish holiday
Saint Lucy's Day, a Christian holiday

Eastern religions 
Diwali, a religious festival associated with Hinduism, Sikhism, and Jainism
Karthika Deepam, a post-Diwali Tamil festival associated with Hinduism
Kartik Purnima, a post-Diwali religious festival associated with Hinduism, Sikhism, and Jainism
Lantern Festival, a Chinese festival, originating in Buddhism, that marks the last day of the Lunar New Year or Spring Festival
Tazaungdaing festival, a Buddhist festival marking the end of Kathina

Other Religions 

 Imbolc, a Gaelic and Neopagan festival

Organized events

Canada 
Cavalcade of Lights Festival, in Toronto, Ontario, Canada
Celebration of Light, a fireworks and light display in Vancouver, British Columbia, Canada
 Celebration of Lights, an annual winter light festival in Sarnia, Ontario, Canada
Festival of Northern Lights, held each winter in Owen Sound, Ontario, Canada
Peterborough Musicfest, formerly named the Peterborough Summer Festival of Lights, a concert series in Peterborough, Ontario, Canada
Winter Festival of Lights in Niagara Falls, Canada

United States 
Celebration of Lights, a former winter lights festival in Pittsburgh, Pennsylvania
Festival of Lights (Hawaii), an annual Christmas celebration in Hawaii
Holiday Trail of Lights, a multi-city event celebrated in Louisiana and Texas in the United States
Magnificent Mile Lights Festival, an annual festival on North Michigan Avenue, Chicago, Illinois
Nights of Lights, an annual holiday light festival in St. Augustine, Florida

Elsewhere 
 Festival of Lights (Berlin)
 Festival of Lights (Lyon), a French local tradition known as Fête des lumières
 Festival of Lights (New Plymouth), a summer event of lights and performances in New Zealand
 Jerusalem Festival of Light, an annual outdoor summer art festival
 Guangzhou International Light Festival, Guangzhou, China
 Nationwide Festival of Light, a series of rallies by conservative Christian groups in September 1971 in the United Kingdom
 Vivid Sydney
 Kobe Luminarie, Kobe, Japan
 Signal Festival, Prague

Other uses 
Festival of Lights (film), a 2010 film
 Festival of Light Australia, an advocacy group